Ernst Stahl-Nachbaur (6 March 1886 – 13 May 1960) was a German film actor.

Early life 
Stahl-Nachbaur was born in Munich, Germany and died at age 74 in Berlin.

Selected filmography

 Das Geschlecht der Schelme. 1. Teil (1917)
 Das verlorene Paradies (1917)
 Eugen Onegin (1919) - Fürst Gremin
 Zwischen Tod und Leben (1919) - Fritz Nettenmair
 Fidelio (1919) - Gouveneur
 Pogrom (1919) - Krassowsky
 Maria Pavlowna (1919) - Polizist Maximowitsch
 Aus eines Mannes Mädchenjahren (1919)
 König Nicolo (1919) - King Nicolo
 Lillis Ehe (1919) - Dr. Goldmann
 Lilli (1919) - Count von Simon
 Zwischen neun und neun (1919) - Stanislaus Demba
 Zwangsliebe im Freistaat (1919) - Dr. Erhardt Kraft
 Der verführte Heilige (1919)
 Gewalt gegen Recht (1920) - Minister
 Satanas (1920) - Prince Alfonso d'Este
 Die Welt ohne Hunger (1920) - Fred Bell
 Narrentanz der Liebe (1920) - Student Alfred Freese
 Johannes Goth (1920) - Johannes Goth
 Panic in the House of Ardon (1920) - Welteroberer
 Sieger Tod (1920) - Prof. Ernst Gorrit
 Intrigue (1920) - Luigi Paoli, Sekretär des Marchese
 Nixchen (1920) - Herbert Gröndal (Ehemann)
 The Marquise of O (1920) - Felippo
 The Bull of Olivera (1921) - Leutnant Herbaut
 Hazard (1921) - Der strenge Gatte
 The Amazon (1921)
 About the Son (1921)
 The Oath of Peter Hergatz (1921)
 Die Schuldige (1921) - Graf von Friesen
 Christopher Columbus (1923) - Duke of Medina-Celli
 All for Money (1923) - Direktor der Goliath-Werke
 Modern Marriages (1924) - Baron von Norden
 Attorney for the Heart (1927) - James Rigdon
 Under Suspicion (1928) - Commissioner Dr. Bernburg
 Berlin After Dark (1928)
 The Republic of Flappers (1928) - John Enders
 Flucht vor Blond (1928)
 Scandal in Baden-Baden (1929) - John Leeds
 Nachtgestalten (1929)
 Diary of a Coquette (1929) - Consul Hechenberg
 Die Ehe (1929)
 Kolonne X (1929) - Commissioner Weigert
 A Mother's Love (1929) - Erich Vogt
 The Unusual Past of Thea Carter (1929) - Van Ruyten
 The League of Three (1929) - Renard
 Gefahren der Brautzeit (1930) - Mc-Clure
 Stud. chem. Helene Willfüer (1930) - Professor Ambrosius
 There Is a Woman Who Never Forgets You (1930)
 Dangers of the Engagement Period (1930) - Holzknecht, Kriminalrat
 A Student's Song of Heidelberg (1930) - John Miller
 Boycott (1930) - Generaldirektor Haller
 Woman in the Jungle (1931) - Robert Crosbie
 Danton (1931) - Louis XVI
 Fra Diavolo (1931) - Der Gouverneur
 M (1931) - Police Chief
 Der Kongreß tanzt (1931) - Napoleon I. (uncredited)
 The Men Around Lucy (1931) - Prunier
 The Daredevil (1931) - George Brown aka Mac Born
 Wäsche - Waschen - Wohlergehen (1932) - Kaufmann
  (1932) - Jänicke - Generaldirektor
 The Eleven Schill Officers (1932) - Hauptmann Busch
 Dreaming Lips (1932) - Polizist
 Weiße Majestät (1933) - Defense lawyer
 Abenteuer eines jungen Herrn in Polen (1934) - Oberst von Keller
 Glückspilze (1935) - Dr. Kahn
 Strife Over the Boy Jo (1937) - Frauenarzt Prof. Desmartin
 Das Ehesanatorium (1938) - Rudolf Burg
 Spaßvögel (1939) - Dr. Rose
 Das Herz der Königin (1940) - Jon Knox
 Immer nur Du (1941) - Der Filmregisseur
 Der große Schatten (1942) - Intendant des Provinztheaters
 The War of the Oxen (1943) - Heinrich von Burghausen
 Titanic (1943) - Oberrichter (uncredited)
 Ein glücklicher Mensch (1943) - Philologe
 Opfergang (1944) - Sanitätsrat Terboven
 The Murderers Are Among Us (1946) - Arzt
 Allez Hopp (1946) - Urmann
 Chased by the Devil (1950) - Professor Schmederlein
 Die Tat des Anderen (1951)
 Border Post 58 (1951) - Kriminalkommissar Bernrieder
 Turtledove General Delivery (1952) - Arthur Gomoll, Generaldirektor
 Mein Herz darfst du nicht fragen (1952) - Professor
 Ave Maria (1953) - Dr. Rieser
 Captain Wronski (1954) - Ein deutscher Abwehrgeneral
 The Angel with the Flaming Sword (1954)
 The Confession of Ina Kahr (1954)
 Canaris (1954)
 Ein Mann vergißt die Liebe (1955)
 The Plot to Assassinate Hitler (1955) - Feldmarschall, Oberfehlshaber einer Heeresgruppe
 Der Hauptmann und sein Held (1955) - General
 One Woman Is Not Enough? (1955) - Dr. Dickreiter
 Spy for Germany (1956) - Atomprofessor
 Stresemann (1957) - Stresemann's Doctor
 Kalle wird Bürgermeister (1957)
  (1958) - Prior
 Der Schinderhannes (1958) - Kasper Bückler
 Old Heidelberg (1959) - Fürst von Sachsen-Karlsburg (final film role)

External links

1886 births
1960 deaths
German male film actors
German male silent film actors
Male actors from Munich
20th-century German male actors